Yours Conditionally is the fourth studio album by the musical duo Tennis, released on their own label, Mutually Detrimental, on March 10, 2017.

Background
As with their debut record, Cape Dory (2011), the majority of the album was written by Patrick Riley and Alaina Moore during a four-month sailing excursion from San Diego, California to Cabo San Lucas and in the Sea of Cortez.

Critical reception

Yours Conditionally was generally well-received upon its initial release. Tim Sendra of AllMusic gave the album four and a ½ stars out of five, calling the album "punchy and sharp, still influenced by classic pop/rock song structures and recognizable to fans of Buddy Holly or the Shirelles, but with some new elements mixed in," deeming it their "best record so far." PopMatters granted the album seven out of ten stars, noting: "Yours Conditionally makes no attempt to reinvent Tennis and suffers from the same flaws that have mired much of their music, namely a tendency toward pleasant predictability. While the album is largely content to reside in familiar, unchallenging territory, however, it is also a lean and well-crafted set of pop songs with more bite than it lets on. It remains a largely satisfying venture that adds nuance, definition, and depth to the band’s already well-established sound."

Canadian publication Exclaim! gave the album a positive review, comparing both the instrumentation and Moore's vocals to Carole King and Fleetwood Mac. Laura Browning of The A.V. Club published a middling review of the album, writing: "Even with some outstanding singles, the album as a whole finds the group somewhere between its comfort zone and a confident next step, with many of the songs bleeding forgettably into one another."

Track listing

Personnel
Alaina Moore – vocals, keys, guitar, percussion
Patrick Riley – guitar, bass, keys, drums, percussion
Steve Voss – drums, percussion

Charts

References

External links
Yours Conditionally at Discogs

2017 albums
Self-released albums
Tennis (band) albums